Aruta is a genus of moths in the subfamily Lymantriinae. The genus was erected by Charles Swinhoe in 1922.

Species
Aruta flavipes (Hampson, [1893]) Sikkim
Aruta puncticilia (Moore, 1872) Nilgiri Mountains

References

Lymantriinae
Moth genera